Phantom Ranger may refer to:
 Phantom Ranger (Power Rangers), a character from Power Rangers Turbo
 Phantom Ranger (film), a 1938 American Western film